Matt Haig (born 3 July 1975) is an English author and journalist. He has written both fiction and non-fiction books for children and adults, often in the speculative fiction genre.

Early life
Haig was born on 3 July 1975 in Sheffield. He went on to study English and History at the University of Hull.

Career
Haig is the author of both fiction and non-fiction for children and adults. His work of non-fiction, Reasons to Stay Alive, was a number one Sunday Times bestseller and was in the UK top 10 for 46 weeks. His bestselling children's novel, Father Christmas and Me, is currently being adapted for film, produced by StudioCanal and Blueprint Pictures.

His novels are often dark and quirky takes on family life. The Last Family in England retells Shakespeare's Henry IV, Part 1 with the protagonists as dogs. His second novel Dead Fathers Club is based on Hamlet, telling the story of an introspective 11-year-old dealing with the recent death of his father and the subsequent appearance of his father's ghost. His third adult novel, The Possession of Mr Cave, deals with an obsessive father desperately trying to keep his teenage daughter safe. His children's novel, Shadow Forest, is a fantasy that begins with the horrific death of the protagonists' parents. It won the Nestlé Children's Book Prize in 2007. He followed it with the sequel, Runaway Troll, in 2008.

Haig's vampire novel The Radleys was published in 2011. In 2013, he published The Humans. It is the story of an alien who takes the identity of a university lecturer whose work in mathematics 
threatens the stability of the planet who must also cope with the home life which accompanies his task.

In 2017, Haig published How to Stop Time, a novel about a man who appears to be 40 but has, in fact, lived for more than 400 years and has met Shakespeare, Captain Cook and F. Scott Fitzgerald. In an interview with The Guardian, Haig revealed the book has been optioned by StudioCanal films, and Benedict Cumberbatch had been "lined up to star" in the film adaptation. Reasons to Stay Alive won the Books Are My Bag Readers' Awards in 2016 and How to Stop Time was nominated in 2017. In August 2018, he wrote lyrics for English singer and songwriter Andy Burrows's music album, the title of which was derived from Haig's book Reasons to Stay Alive.

In 2020, Matt Haig released his novel The Midnight Library about a young woman named Nora Seed who is unhappy with her choices in life. During the night she tries to kill herself but ends up in a library managed by her school librarian, Mrs. Elm. The library is between life and death with millions of books filled with stories of her life had she made some decisions differently. In this library, she then tries to find the life in which she's the most content. It was shortlisted for the 2021 British Book Awards "Fiction book of the year". The Midnight Library was adapted for radio and broadcast in ten episodes on BBC Radio 4 in December 2020.

In 2021, Haig appeared on Storybound, accompanied by an original score from Robert Wynia.

The Comfort Book was released on 1 July 2021.

Personal life

, Haig was married to Andrea Semple, and they lived in Brighton, Sussex, with their two children and a dog. The children were homeschooled. 

Haig identifies as an atheist. He has said that books are his one true faith, and the library is his church.

Some of Haig's work—especially part of the non-fiction books—is inspired by the mental breakdown he suffered from when he was 24 years old. He still occasionally suffers from anxiety.

Works

Novels
The Last Family in England (Jonathan Cape, 2004); US title, The Labrador Pact
The Dead Fathers Club (Cape, 2006)
The Possession of Mr Cave (The Bodley Head, 2008)
The Radleys (Canongate Books, 2010)
The Humans (Canongate Books, 2013)
How to Stop Time (Canongate Books, 2017)
The Midnight Library (Canongate Books, 2020)
Tales of Connection (Van Ditmar, 2021), a selection of stories from Notes on a nervous planet, The comfort book and Reasons to stay alive.

Children's books
Shadow Forest (2007); US title, Samuel Blink and the Forbidden Forest
Runaway Troll (Cape, 2008); US title, Samuel Blink and the Runaway Troll
To Be A Cat (Atheneum, 2013)
Echo Boy (Bodley, 2014)
A Boy Called Christmas (Canongate Books, 2015)
The Girl Who Saved Christmas (Canongate Books, 2016)
Father Christmas and Me (Canongate Books, 2017)
The Truth Pixie (Canongate Books, 2018)
Evie and the Animals (Canongate Books, 2019)
The Truth Pixie Goes to School (Canongate Books, 2019)
Evie in the Jungle (Canongate Books, 2020)

Non-fiction
How Come You Don't Have An E-Strategy (Kogan Page, 2002)
Brand Failures (Kogan Page, 2003)
Brand Royalty (Kogan Page, 2004)
Brand Success (Kogan Page, 2011)
Reasons to Stay Alive (Canongate Books, 2015)
Notes on a Nervous Planet (Canongate Books, 2018)
The Comfort Book (Canongate Books, 2021)

References

External links
 

1975 births
Living people
21st-century English male writers
21st-century English novelists
Alumni of the University of Hull
British writers
English children's writers
English atheists
English male novelists
Homeschooling advocates
People from Brighton
Writers from Sheffield